Lago Nero, Italian for "Black Lake", may refer to:

Switzerland
Lago Nero (Ticino)

Italy
Lago Nero (Bergamo), a lake in the Province of Bergamo
Lago Nero (Piacenza), a lake in the Province of Piacenza
Lago Nero (Pistoia), a lake in the Province of Pistoia
Lago Nero (Valsesia), a lake in the Province of Vercelli

See also
Lagonegro, a municipality of the Province of Potenza, Basilicata
Black Lake (disambiguation)